Nordea Bank Abp, commonly referred to as Nordea, is a European financial services group operating in northern Europe and based in Helsinki, Finland. The name is a blend of the words "Nordic" and "idea". The bank is the result of the successive mergers and acquisitions of the Finnish, Swedish, Danish, and Norwegian banks of Merita Bank, Nordbanken, Unidanmark, and Christiania Bank og Kreditkasse that took place between 1997 and 2001. The Nordic countries are considered Nordea's home market, having finalised the sales of their Baltic operations in 2019. Nordea is listed on Nasdaq Nordic exchanges in Helsinki, Copenhagen, and Stockholm and Nordea ADR is listed in the US.

Nordea serves 9.3 million private and 530,000 active corporate customers, including 2,650 large corporates and institutions. Nordea's credit portfolio is distributed across Finland (21%), Denmark (26%), Norway (21%), and Sweden (30%). There are four Business Areas (BAs) at Nordea, Personal Banking, Business Banking, Large Corporates & Institutions, and Asset & Wealth Management. Assets under Management (AUM) were €411 billion in December 2021.

History
Nordea's roots date to 1820 and Sparekassen for Kjøbenhavn og Omegn in Denmark, and a complete family tree of around 300 banks including some of the oldest banks in the Nordic region. This includes Wermlandsbanken of Sweden (founded 1832), Christiania Kreditkasse of Norway (founded 1848) and Union Bank of Finland (UBF) of Finland (founded 1862). Between 1997 and 2001, the Finnish, Swedish, Danish, and Norwegian banks of Merita Bank, Nordbanken, Unidanmark, and Christiania Bank og Kreditkasse merged into the present day Nordea.

Merita Group was formed in 1995, when UBF and Kansallis-Osake-Pankki (KOP) merged. UBF was established, in 1862, at a time when there were no Limited Liability Companies Act or banking laws in Finland. Therefore, it was modelled after banking standards in other countries. UBF eventually merged with rivals Nordiska Aktiebanken in 1919 and Helsingin Osakepankki (HOP) in 1986. KOP was originally founded in 1890 with its first branch at Aleksanterinkatu 17, in Helsinki. By 1913, KOP had become the second largest commercial bank in Finland. The two banks, KOP and UBF, competed for the title of the largest bank in Finland for decades. KOP suffered large credit losses as a result of the Finnish banking crisis in the early 1990s. On 1 April 1995 it became a subsidiary (51%) of Merita Group in a direct share issue.

Nordbanken was formed in 1986 by a merger of two smaller private local banks, Uplandsbanken and Sundsvallsbanken, though it was the product of numerous original institutions. The oldest of the original Nordbanken constituent banks was Wermlandsbanken, which was founded in 1832. Nordbanken came under Swedish government control in 1992, following the Swedish banking crisis in the early 1990s, with the sale of its non-performing loans to the Swedish government and significant reduction in personnel. Bad debts were transferred to the asset-management company Securum, which sold off the assets. At the time, the approach of establishing "good" and "bad" banks composed of corresponding assets was a novel resolution approach.

Merita Group merged with Nordbanken in 1997 forming MeritaNordbanken. The Solo internet-based banking operation of MeritaNordbanken was a global pioneer and leader providing mobile and internet banking access in 1999. The bank reached 1 million internet banking customers during 1999 with 3 million log-ins and 3.7 million payments per month. Housing loans via Solo were introduced in 1999. MeritaNordbanken agreed to buy Unidanmark, Denmark's second-largest bank, in early 2000 creating the Nordic region's biggest financial institution with €186 billion in assets. The merged group had a banking market share of 20% in Sweden, 25% in Denmark and 40% in Finland and a combined workforce of 28,050. By end 2000, MeritaNordbanken had further merged with Christiania Bank og Kreditkasse of Norway, a process started in 1999 and changed its name to Nordea. Christiania Bank had also been impacted severely during the banking crisis in the early 1990s, with Nordea acquiring the bank from the Norwegian Government Bank Investment Fund with a 35% share.

Nordea expanded into Poland, the Baltics and Russia in the early 2000s, with 2% of total revenues from the Poland and Baltics region. Nordea divested of Polish operations in 2013, with the sale to PKO Bank Polski for €694 million. By end 2014, lending in the Baltics was €8.2 billion and in Russia €4.5 billion. During the period 2013-2017 exposure to the Russian market was reduced by 63%. In 2016, Luminor was formed by a merger of Nordea's and DNB's operations in Estonia, Latvia and Lithuania creating the third largest Baltic regional bank with assets of €15 billion and a market share of 16.4%. Luminor was sold to Blackstone, with Nordea and DNB retaining each initially a 20% share. However, the full divestment was completed in 2019. Exit from the Russian, Baltic and Polish markets were part of Nordea's de-risking strategy, which also included reduced exposures to some sectors (e.g. Shipping, Oil & Offshore and Agriculture in Denmark). Nordea was one of the Nordic banks, including Danske Bank, SEB and Swedbank, allegedly involved in the money laundering scandal, involving ex-Soviet states, that emerged in 2017.

Nordea announced plans to move its corporate headquarters from Stockholm, Sweden to Helsinki, Finland in September 2017. The re-domicilation of Nordea to Finland put it within the supervision of the European Central Bank and within the European Union's banking union. In October 2018, Nordea completed the move of its corporate headquarters to Helsinki, Finland.

Performance and ownership
Market capitalisation of Nordea was €29.3 billion at year end 2019, making it the seventh largest Nordic company and among the 10 largest European financial groups. Since the merger of MeritaNordbanken and Unidanmark in 2000, the share price of Nordea has appreciated 79% with a clear outperformance to the STOXX Europe 600 Banks Index (-57.4%). With approximately 580,000 registered shareholders at the end of 2019, Nordea has one of the largest shareholding bases of any Nordic company. The largest shareholding group is institutions, with approximately 22.2%  Non-Nordic shareholders are 31% as of end 2019. Nordea's 10 largest shareholders are:

Nordea Fonden, 3.9%
Blackrock, 2.9%
Alecta, 2.8%
Vanguard Funds, 2.7%
Cevian Capital, 2.3%
Swedbank Robur Funds, 2.0%
Varma Mutual Pension Insurance Company, 1.5%
Nordea Funds, 1.1%
Norwegian Petroleum Fund, 1.0%

Business areas
There are four Business Areas (BAs) at Nordea, Personal Banking, Business Banking, Large Corporates & Institutions, and Asset & Wealth Management.

Scandals 
Nordea was the subject of an online phishing scam in 2007. The company estimated 8 million kr ($1.1 million) was stolen. Customers were targeted over a period of 15 months with phishing emails containing a trojan horse. Nordea refunded affected customers.

The largest financial group in the Nordic region, Nordea was, despite warnings from the Swedish Financial Supervisory Authority (FI) active in using offshore companies in tax havens according to the Panama papers. Other Swedish banks were mentioned in the documents, but mention of Nordea occurred 10,902 times and the second-most mentioned bank has 764 matches. In 2012, Nordea asked Mossack Fonseca to change documents retroactively so that three Danish customers power of attorney documents had been in force since 2010. Nordea bank loaned billions of euros to shipping companies that own vessels in secrecy jurisdictions such as Bermuda, Cyprus, Panama, BVI, the Cayman Islands and the Isle of Man. In the Paradise Papers, Nordea was shown to have lent a significant amount of money to customers based in tax havens. As a consequence of the leaked documents, the Swedish Financial Supervisory Authority (FI) stated on 4 April 2016 that it had started an investigation into the conduct of Nordea.

The Nordea section in Luxembourg, between the years 2004 and 2014, founded nearly 400 offshore companies in Panama and the British Virgin Islands for its customers. The Swedish Financial Supervisory Authority (FI) pointed out that there are "serious deficiencies" in how Nordea monitors money laundering, and gave the bank two warnings. In 2015, Nordea paid the largest possible fine - over 5 million EUR. Stefan Löfven, Prime Minister of Sweden, said in 2016 that he was very critical of the conduct of Nordea and its role, and said: "They are on the list of shame too". The Swedish minister of Finance Magdalena Andersson characterized the conduct of Nordea as "a crime" and "totally unacceptable". The director for Nordea Private banking Thorben Sanders admits that before 2009 they did not screen for customers that tried to evade tax. "At the end of 2009 we decided that our bank should not be a means of tax evasion" says Thorben Sanders. Nordea CEO Casper von Koskull stated that he was disappointed with the shortcomings within Nordea's operating principles, saying that "this cannot be tolerated".

In March 2019, public service broadcasting company, Yle, aired a program that revealed money laundering allegations against Nordea. The company was the biggest Nordic lender allegedly involved in the multi-million-dollar money laundering scheme, according to Bloomberg.

Subsidiaries

Nordea Bank Danmark A/S
Nordea Bank Finland Abp / Nordea Pankki Suomi Oyj
Nordea Bank Latvia
Nordea Bank Lithuania
Nordea Bank Norge ASA
Nordea Bank Polska S.A.
Nordea Bank Russia (closed in 2021)
Nordea Bank Malta AB

See also

 PlusGirot – open clearing system in Sweden owned by Nordea
 European Financial Services Roundtable
 Inter-Alpha Group of Banks
 Kansallis-Osake-Pankki
 List of oldest companies, as Nordea is the oldest bank in Sweden, with roots from 1820.
 List of investors in Bernard L. Madoff Securities

Nordic headquarters

References

External links

Yahoo! – Nordea Bank AB Company Profile

Banks of Sweden
Banks of Finland
Banks of Estonia
Banks of Latvia
Companies listed on Nasdaq Helsinki
Banks established in 2000
2000 establishments in Sweden
Companies based in Helsinki
Companies listed on Nasdaq Copenhagen
Companies listed on Nasdaq Stockholm
Banks of Denmark
Banks of Norway
Banks of Poland
Banks of Lithuania
Banks under direct supervision of the European Central Bank
Finnish companies established in 2000
Swedish companies established in 2000